The Men's +80 kg is a competition featured at the 2011 World Taekwondo Olympic Qualification Tournament, and was held at the Sarhadchi Olympic Center in Baku, Azerbaijan on July 3. The first three ranked athletes qualify their NOCs a place each at the 2012 Olympic Games.

Medalists

Results
Legend
WD — Won by withdrawal

Finals

Top half

Bottom half

References
Draw

Men's 99